Stink Lake Mountain is a small mountain range located in Central New York Region of New York located in the Town of Ohio in Herkimer County and Town of Morehouse in Hamilton County, northeast of Ohio. Stink Lake is located south of the elevation.

References

Mountains of Herkimer County, New York
Mountains of New York (state)